Hibbertia eciliata is a species of flowering plant in the family Dilleniaceae and is endemic to a restricted area of Queensland. It is a sparsely-branched shrub with densely hairy foliage, elliptic  and yellow flowers arranged singly on the ends of branchlets, with between fifty and fifty-four stamens arranged in groups around the two carpels.

Description
There are fifty to fifty-four stamens and a few staminodes arranged in groups around the two carpels, each carpel with two ovules. Flowering has been observed in May.

Taxonomy
Hibbertia eciliata was first formally described in 2010 by Hellmut R. Toelken in the Journal of the Adelaide Botanic Gardens from specimens collected near Cape Flattery in 1990. The specific epithet (eciliata) means "without cilia".

Distribution and habitat
This hibbertia grows on undulating sand dunes and is only known from the type location.

Conservation status
Goodenia eciliata is classified as of "least concern" under the Queensland Government Nature Conservation Act 1992.

See also
List of Hibbertia species

References

eciliata
Flora of Queensland
Plants described in 2010
Taxa named by Hellmut R. Toelken